Randy Colley (May 2, 1950 – December 14, 2019) was an American professional wrestler better known as Moondog Rex. He was best known for his appearances in the World Wrestling Federation as a part of The Moondogs, and as the original Smash of Demolition.

Professional wrestling career

Early career (1970–1980) 
Colley made his debut wrestling as Jack Dalton. Teaming with Jim Dalton, he lost to Bob Boyer and Joe Turner on September 21, 1970 in Panama City, FL at a Gulf Coast Championship Wrestling event. The Dalton Brothers would remain a tag team throughout 1970 and 1971, facing various opponents such as The Welch Brothers and The Australians. In 1972 the Dalton Brothers moved to NWA Mid-America and were ultimately rebranded as "The Medics".

In 1976 he joined Mid-Atlantic Championship Wrestling and began wrestling under his real name for the first time. This would also be his first singles run. While appearing in MACW he would compete against opponents such as Steve Strong, Two Ton Harris, and Larry Sharpe. For the remainder of the 1970s he moved around various National Wrestling Alliance territories.

World Wrestling Federation (1980–1981) 

Colley joined the World Wrestling Federation in 1980, debuting under the name "Ripper Hawkins". Within a few weeks, he was re-packaged as "Moondog Hawkins",  soon after that being renamed "Moondog Rex". Eventually, he was teamed with "Moondog King" (Edward John White) as "The Moondogs" tag team. In 1981 he won the WWF Tag Team Championship with Moondog King (later replaced by Moondog Spot) as the Moondogs. On August 21, 1981 the Moondogs would lose the Tag Team Championship to Rick Martel & Tony Garea. On September 1, 1981 he mounted an unsuccessful challenge to WWF World Heavyweight Champion Bob Backlund, but was defeated.

Georgia Championship Wrestling (1982–1983) 

He next appeared in Georgia Championship Wrestling. Wrestling with Moondog Spot (Larry Latham), the Moondogs made their debut on October 25, 1982 in a match at the Omni against Brad Armstrong and Tito Santana. The Moondogs would continue with the promotion for the next three months, wrestling The Wild Samoans and various combinations that included Stan Hansen.

Continental Wrestling Association (1983–1984) 

Both Moondogs then jumped to the CWA, where they defeated The Fabulous Ones on April 4, 1983 in the Mid South Coliseum to win the Southern Tag Team Championship. They became embroiled in a lengthy feud with the Fabulous Ones and lost the titles to them three weeks later. The Dogs also would team up with Jimmy Hart.

World Wrestling Federation (1984–1985) 

The Moondogs jumped to the World Wrestling Federation in the midst of its national expansion. The Moondogs made their return on the March 4th, 1984 edition of All American Wrestling and defeating Bobby Fulton and Brian Madden. The new duo remained undefeated until June 30, where they lost a Los Angeles house show match to The Wild Samoans. The Moondogs continued to unsuccessfully feud with the Samoans throughout that summer. In June 1984 Colley received two singles shots against WWF Champion Hulk Hogan on the Canadian television tapings that aired on both Maple Leaf and All-Star wrestling. In September 1984 they were programmed into a house show series against the newly arrived Fabulous Freebirds. While continuing to defeat preliminary opposition on television, the Dogs were winless against the Freebirds. Following departure of Michael Hayes, Terry Gordy, and Buddy Roberts from the promotion, the Moondogs feuded with the Brisco Brothers.

The Moondogs entered 1985 on the lower end of the tag team ranks, and were split apart as singles wrestlers to help flesh out house show cards. Colley lost singles matches to Bret Hart, Barry Windham, Jimmy Snuka, Jerry Brisco, and Tony Atlas to start the year, before going on a winning streak that saw him defeat Bobby Colt, and Rick McGraw on the house show circuit. This would continue until April 1985, at which point Colley left the WWF for Bill Watts' Mid South Wrestling Federation.

Mid South Wrestling (1985) 
Colley made his debut for the UWF on April 10, 1985. Wrestling as The Nightmare, he was teamed with Eddie Gilbert and defeated Steve Brinson and Terry Daniels. He was managed by both Eddie Gilbert and Sir Oliver Humperdink and remained undefeated and on May 22, 1985 defeated Terry Taylor to gain the Mid-South North American Title. In June he rebranded himself as The Champion and continued to successfully retain the title against challengers such as Taylor, Magnum T. A., Butch Reed, and Brad Armstrong. The Champion retained the title until August 10, 1985 where he was defeated by Dick Murdoch at the MSW Superdome Extravaganza in New Orleans, LA. Colley suffered his second defeat weeks later, falling to Jake Roberts on television. Colley then began a long losing streak, losing to Wendell Coley and Butch Reed, as well as facing numerous defeats in various tag team matches.

On October 11, 1985 Colley teamed with Eddie Gilbert to capture the Mid-South Tag Team Championship, defeating Al Perez and Wendell Coley. The duo defended the belts for the remainder of the year. Colley left Mid-South following a loss to Al Perez on January 24, 1986 in Houston, Texas.

World Wrestling Federation (1986–1987, 1988) 

On February 22, 1986 Colley made his return to the WWF on a house show in Melbourne, Australia and lost to Jacques Rougeau. Following an April tour of All Japan Pro Wrestling that saw him team with Andre the Giant and Dick Murdoch he returned to full time action in the World Wrestling Federation. On April 14 he was reunited with Moondog Spot, losing to The Rougeau Brothers on Prime Time Wrestling. Colley now found himself in a similar position as in his previous WWF run, defeating preliminary opposition but losing to more established teams. The Moondogs were programmed into a feud with Tony Atlas & Pedro Morales and would also face The US Express as they entered the summer of 1986. Their most high profile match came on the July 12th, 1986 edition of WWF Championship Wrestling, where they lost to WWF World Champion Hulk Hogan and Paul Orndorff; the match being worked entirely by Orndorff and part of the famous feud between the latter that would begin shortly. In the fall of 1986 they began a house show series with The Islanders and finished the year facing The Killer Bees and US Express.

On January 4, 1987, in Springfield, Massachusetts, Colley was repackaged as "Smash" in the new tag team of Demolition, facing and defeating the Islanders before later taking part in a battle royal won by Pete Doherty. The following day in East Rutherford, New Jersey, he made his televised debut at a WWF Superstars taping. Despite having his hair trimmed, his beard shaved off, and wearing face paint, fans almost immediately recognized him and began chanting "Moondog" when he entered the ring. Following a third appearance, this time at a Wrestling Challenge taping, he was replaced by Barry Darsow.

As a consolation to being dropped from Demolition, Colley was repackaged again as part of the masked wrestling team The Shadows with partner Jose Luis Rivera. They made their debut under their new gimmick on April 23, 1987 in Worcester, MA at a WWF Superstars taping, defeating Lanny Poffo and Nick Kiniski in a dark match. Their first television appearance would come on the May 16th edition of Superstars where they teamed with Iron Mike Sharpe and were defeated by Billy Jack Haynes, Tito Santana, and Blackjack Mulligan. Unlike Demolition, The Shadows were used as enhancement talent and embarked on a lengthy losing streak to The Young Stallions on the house show circuit that spring. It would be several months later before the new team would gain their second victory, as it was July 24, 1987 when they finally had their hands raised when they defeated Lanny Poffo & S. D. Jones at a house show in Detroit, MI. However that would be Colley's final victory in the promotion as the Shadows dropped matches to The Killer Bees, Rougeau Brothers, and Strike Force during the summer and fall of 1987. The duo disbanded after Colley left the company at the end of October 1987.

Colley would return in a one-off on November 26, 1988. Wrestling simply as "The Shadow", he was defeated by Boris Zukhov at a house show in Detroit, MI.

In 1994, Colley was called as a prosecution witness in the Vince McMahon steroid distribution trial on Long Island, New York.

Continental Championship Wrestling  (1988–1989) 
After Demolition ended for him in the WWF and following a stint in Stampede Wrestling, he went to Continental Championship Wrestling where he worked as "Detroit Demolition". He was able to do this because he was co-creator of the original gimmick.  Colley as Detroit Demolition was managed by Downtown Bruno and teamed with Lord Humungous until Humungous turned fan favorite and allied with (kayfabe) childhood friend Shane Douglas against Bruno and his men.  Detroit Demolition was also a member of The Stud Stable.

World Championship Wrestling (1990–1991) 
In the summer of 1990, Colley returned to WCW as Moondog Rex in singles competition. His first match was at a July 6 house show in Norfolk, Virginia, against El Gigante. His televised debut came several months later, when he appeared on World Championship Wrestling on September 29, and defeated Reno Riggins. Colley's highest profile match was losing to the Junkyard Dog at Halloween Havoc 90. Wrestling as Moondog Rex he continued to appear on televised programs and house shows into the spring of 1991.

In May 1991 World Championship Wrestling (WCW) created a stable  known as "the Desperados" consisting of Dutch Mantell, Black Bart, and Colley, who played "Deadeye Dick". The Desperados were packaged with the gimmick of being three bumbling cowboys looking to meet Stan Hansen to go to WCW and become a team. Over the course of a few weeks, they were promoted through a series of vignettes in which they were beaten up in saloons, searched ghost towns, were jailed, and rode horses. The Desperadoes entered the ring for the first time at house show in Charlotte, NC on May 12, 1991, where they (Bart and Dutch Mantell) were defeated by The Young Pistols.

Later that month Colley began teaming regularly with Black Bart in house show matches against Ricky Morton and Dustin Rhodes. The full Desperadoes trio entered the ring for the first time on July 3, 1991 in East Rutherford, NJ at the start of the 1991 The Great American Bash tour, where they were defeated by The Freebirds and Badstreet Brad Armstrong.

While the Desperadoes angle continued and the trio was shown as late as the June 29th WCW Power Hour program still looking for Stan Hansen, the former AWA champion reportedly wanted no part of the storyline and left for Japan, never to return to wrestle in North America. Without Hansen, the group were dissolved as a stable, with Colley finishing his run following a loss to the Freebirds on July 21, 1991 in Knoxville, TN. After leaving WCW, Colley would take a hiatus form wrestling for a couple of years.  He briefly reunited with Demolition Ax (Bill Eadie) and his "New Demolition" partner Blast (Carmine Azzato), on the independent circuit before the WWF sent Eadie a cease and desist letter.

Smoky Mountain Wrestling (1993–1994) 

On November 8, 1993 Colley reunited with Moondog Spot to face The Rock 'n' Roll Express in a dark match at a Smoky Mountain Wrestling TV taping in Newton, NC. The Moondogs would join the company full time and feuded with the Rock 'n' Roll Express, wrestling to a series of no contests. In early 1994 the duo moved on to feud with The Bruise Brothers and began to split their time between the promotion and the United States Wrestling Association. Following a loss to the Rock 'n' Roll Express on March 6, 1994 they left SMW.

United States Wrestling Association (1994–1997) 

After making joint appearances in both the USWA and SMW, the Moondogs joined the company full time in March 1994 and began a feud with Jerry Lawler and Brian Christopher. On March 14 they captured the USWA World Tag Team Championship from Billy Joe Travis and The Spellbinder. They would lose the titles later that year, but regained them on October 24, 1994 against The Phantoms (Phantom Sorrow and Phantom Tragedy) at the Mid South Coliseum. In November they lost and then regained the USWA tag titles from The Bruise Brothers.

The Moondogs entered 1995 having lost the USWA titles once more and entered a tournament to crown new champions; they wrestled The Rock 'n' Roll Express to a no-contest in the finals at the Mid South Coliseum on January 9, 1995. That spring they would feud with Crusher Bones, Jack Hammer, and Big Daddy Cyrus. Their run in the company ended that year with a match at the USWA's Mid South Memphis Memories II card, where they were defeated by The Fabulous Ones.

In 1996 the duo returned once more, defeating Jimmy Harris and Ron Harris at the Mid South Coliseum on January 2. In April 1996 they began to feud with former WWF Tag Team Champions Men on a Mission, the latter on loan from the World Wrestling Federation. On April 22, 1996 the Moondogs defeated Men on a Mission via pinfall at the Mid South Coliseum. In June the Moondogs were booked into a tournament to crown the USWA's Southern Tag Team Champions, but were defeated by Brickhouse Brown and Reggie B Fine in the first round. In the summer the Moondogs regained the USWA Tag Team Championship for a final time. The Moondogs left USWA that fall, a year before the promotion closed its doors. 

Colley wrestled his last match for IWA Mid-South in 1997.

Death
Colley died on December 14, 2019 in Jackson, Tennessee (a week after undergoing amputation of his right leg above the knee) from a blood infection and complications relating to diabetes. He was 69 years old.

Championships and accomplishments
Continental Wrestling Association
AWA Southern Tag Team Championship (1 time) – with Moondog Spot
Georgia Championship Wrestling
NWA Georgia Tag Team Championship (2 times) – with Assassin #1
Gulf Coast Championship Wrestling – Southeastern Championship Wrestling
NWA Gulf Coast Tag Team Championship (1 time) – with Jim Dalton
NWA Southeastern Continental Tag Team Championship (1 time) – with D.I. Bob Carter
Hardcore Championship Wrestling
HCW Tag Team Championship (1 time) – with Steve Morton
Mid-South Wrestling Association
Mid-South North American Heavyweight Championship (1 time)
Mid-South Tag Team Championship (1 time) – with Eddie Gilbert
United States Wrestling Association
USWA World Tag Team Championship (3 times) – with Moondog Spot
World Wrestling Council
WWC North American Tag Team Championship (2 times) – with Moondog Spot
WWC World Tag Team Championship (1 time) – with Moondog Spot
WWC Caribbean Tag Team Championship (2 times) – with Moondog Spot
World Wrestling Federation
WWF Tag Team Championship (1 time) – with Moondog King and replacement partner Moondog Spot

References

External links
OWW Profile

1950 births
2019 deaths
People from Alexander City, Alabama
American male professional wrestlers
Professional wrestlers from Alabama
Professional wrestlers from Michigan
Stampede Wrestling alumni
USWA World Tag Team Champions
The Stud Stable members